USS Trippe may refer to the following ships of the United States Navy:

 , purchased in 1812, served in the War of 1812 and was burned by the British
 , a  launched in 1910 and served in World War I; and the United States Coast Guard from 1924 to 1930
 , a  launched in 1938, served in World War II and was sunk as a result of her participation in Operation Crossroads
 , a  launched in 1969 and decommissioned in 1991

See also
 Trippe (disambiguation)

United States Navy ship names